Lava International (stylized as LΛVΛ) is an Indian multinational electronics company that manufactures smartphones, laptops, computer hardware and consumer electronics. It was founded in 2009 by Hari Om Rai, Sunil Bhalla, Shailendra Nath Rai and Vishal Sehgal as an offshoot of a telecommunication venture. It is headquartered in Noida, Uttar Pradesh, India, and has overseas operations in a number of countries.

Structure
Lava is headquartered in Noida sector 64, Uttar Pradesh, India. The company maintains 6 offices and 3 manufacturing and service facilities throughout India.

Lava has a single-layer distribution model, wherein more than 900 distributors across India are directly managed and controlled by the company. Lava is also present in several countries like Thailand, Sri Lanka, Middle-East, Bangladesh, Indonesia and Nepal.

Research and development
For designing and developing its products, Lava has set up Research and development facilities in India and abroad, with particular investment in India after the Government's Make in India and Atmanirbhar Bharat initiatives.

Market share
The company held a market share of 13.4% in the feature phone segment in India in the financial year 2021.

Products 
Latest Phones

Blaze 5G

Blaze Pro

Blaze NXT

Agni 5G

Awards and honours 
Lava received an award from the Government of Uttar Pradesh in July 2017 for hiring the most number of apprentices in the state. The company hired 710 apprentices from Uttar Pradesh in 2016 in keeping with the guidelines laid down in the Apprenticeship Act, 1961.

See also
 List of mobile phone brands by country
 List of companies of India
 List of trains run by Indian Railways
 Micromax Informatics
 Karbonn Mobiles
 Intex Technologies
 Spice
 Xolo

References

External links 
 
 

Mobile phone manufacturers
Mobile phone companies of India
Manufacturing companies based in Noida
Indian companies established in 2009
Indian brands
Electronics companies established in 2009
2009 establishments in Uttar Pradesh